Pope John IX (died January 900) was the bishop of Rome and ruler of the Papal States from January 898 to his death.

Early life
Little is known about John IX before he became pope. Born in Tivoli to a man named Rampoaldo, he was ordained as a Benedictine priest by Pope Formosus. With the support of the powerful duke of Spoleto he was elected pope in early 898 following the sudden death of Pope Theodore II.

Pontificate
With a view to diminish the violence of faction in Rome, John held several synods in Rome and elsewhere in 898. They not only confirmed the judgment of Pope Theodore II in granting Christian burial to Pope Formosus, but also at a council held at Ravenna decreed that the records of the Cadaver Synod held by Pope Stephen VI which had condemned him should be burned. Re-ordinations were forbidden, and those of the clergy who had been degraded by Stephen were restored to the ranks from which he had deposed them. The custom of plundering the palaces of bishops or popes on their death was ordered to be put down both by the spiritual and temporal authorities.

To keep their independence, which was threatened by the Germans, the Moravians appealed to John to let them have a hierarchy of their own. Ignoring the complaints of the German hierarchy, John sanctioned the consecration of a metropolitan bishop and three more bishops for the Moravians.

Finding that it was advisable to cement the ties between the empire and the papacy, John IX gave unhesitating support to Lambert of Spoleto in preference to Arnulf of Carinthia during the Synod of Rome, and also induced the council to determine that henceforth the consecration of the Popes should take place only in the presence of the imperial legates. The sudden death of Lambert shattered the hopes which this alliance seemed to promise.

John IX died in the year 900 and was succeeded by Pope Benedict IV (900–903).

Sources

Literature

External links

 Opera Omnia by Migne Patrologia Latina with analytical indexes
 

9th-century births
900 deaths
People from Tivoli, Lazio
Popes
Italian popes
9th-century archbishops
Year of birth unknown
9th-century popes
10th-century popes
Benedictine popes
Burials at St. Peter's Basilica